Luojiaba station is a metro station on the Loop Line of Chongqing Rail Transit in Nan'an District of Chongqing Municipality, China.

It serves the area surrounding Yusheng Road, including a nearby hospital and 2 nearby schools.

The station opened on 1 July 2019.

Station Structure

Floors

Notes:
Signage boards of Exit 1 in the station contains no information on nearby places.
As of July 2019, only the elevator at Exit 1 that connects the station with ground level is under construction, while the 2 other elevators, 1 connecting the station with ground level at Exit 2 and the other, responsible for connecting the concourse with the platform are in use.

Loop Line Platform
Platform Layout
An island platform is used for Loop Line trains travelling in both directions. Loop Line trains can access the car depot from using the railway junction. The station can also act as a reversing station using its scissors crossover for trains to switch direction.

The railway junction is located on the right side of this diagram

Exits
There are a total of 4 entrances/exits for the station.

Surroundings

Nearby Places
Yusheng Road
Yanyu Road
Furen Road
Nanping Experimental Primary School
Chongqing Furen High School
Nan'an District Maternal and Child Health Hospital

Nearby Stations
Sigongli station (a Loop Line & Line 3 Station)
Haitangxi station (a Loop Line station)

See also
Chongqing Rail Transit (CRT)
Loop Line (CRT)

References

Railway stations in Chongqing
Railway stations in China opened in 2019
Chongqing Rail Transit stations